Luling may refer to:

China 
 Luling, Suzhou, Anhui (芦岭镇), town in Yongqiao District, Suzhou, Anhui
 Luling (廬陵), old name for Ji'an in Jiangxi

United States 
 Luling, Louisiana
 Luling, Texas
Luling High School

See also 
 Günter Lüling (1928–2014), German theologian